Kenneth Lyle Houston (September 15, 1953 – March 10, 2018) was a Canadian ice hockey player who played nine seasons in the National Hockey League (NHL) between 1975 and 1984. He helped the Calgary Flames reach the NHL playoff semifinals for the first time in club history in 1981.

Playing career
Originally drafted by the Atlanta Flames in the 1973 NHL Entry Draft, Houston played seven seasons for the franchise, including two after the team relocated to Calgary. He was traded along with Pat Riggin to the Washington Capitals following the 1981–82 NHL season.

Houston played for the Capitals until October 1983 when he was dealt along with Brian Engblom to the Los Angeles Kings in the trade that sent Larry Murphy to the Capitals. He retired at the end of the 1983–84 NHL season.

Post-playing career

Houston died of cancer on March 10, 2018.

The hockey arena in Dresden, Ontario, the Ken Houston Memorial Agricultural Centre, is named in his honour. An annual harness horse race at Dresden Raceway is dedicated to him.

Regular season and playoffs

References

External links

Profile at hockeydraftcentral.com

1953 births
2018 deaths
Atlanta Flames draft picks
Atlanta Flames players
Calgary Flames players
Canadian ice hockey right wingers
Deaths from cancer in Ontario
Edmonton Oilers (WHA) draft picks
Ice hockey people from Ontario
Los Angeles Kings players
Nova Scotia Voyageurs players
Omaha Knights (CHL) players
Sportspeople from Chatham-Kent
Washington Capitals players